Richard Alexander Geddes (5 November 1921 – 12 August 1992) was a politician in the State of South Australia.

History
He was born a son of James Sim Geddes (1877–1931), timber merchant and three times mayor of Port Pirie, and his wife, (Mary) Mildred Geddes, née Giles (died 22 October 1951).

He served in the 2nd AIF during World War II, and as Lieutenant Geddes married Corporal Pam Hartley Williams at St. Peter's College Chapel in 1944. He was for a short time Governor of Sarawak and awarded an MBE in 1947.

He was elected for the Liberal Party to a Northern districts seat in the Legislative Council in March 1965, survived the transition to single-electorate voting in 1975, and retired in September 1979.

Family
He married Pamela Hartley Williams on 28 November 1944 and lived at Eden Valley. They had four children, all of whom are believed living today.

He had four brothers - Charles Owen Geddes, grazier of Melrose; Peter Henry Giles Geddes of Port Lincoln, (James) Owen Geddes MBE, of Port Pirie; and Robert Grant Geddes, who was killed in action in 1941. Richard and these last three were conspicuous in the 2nd AIF during World War II.

References 

Members of the South Australian Legislative Council
1921 births
1992 deaths
Liberal and Country League politicians
People from Port Pirie
20th-century Australian politicians
Australian military personnel of World War II